Huskisson railway station was located on the North Liverpool Extension Line near Huskisson Dock in Liverpool, England.

The station opened in 1880 and closed to passenger traffic as early as July 1885. The site was within Huskisson Goods Yards and continued in use as a freight depot until 1975. It was the terminus of the branch.

An enthusiasts' railtour visited the station on 13 June 1964.

References

Sources

External links
 The station's history Disused Stations UK
 Station on a 1948 O.S. map npe Maps]
 Station on an Edwardian OSmap overlay National Library of Scotland
 Station and local lines on multiple maps Rail Maps Online
 Station and line HUS railwaycodes
 Railtours sixbellsjunction

Disused railway stations in Liverpool
Former Cheshire Lines Committee stations
Railway stations in Great Britain opened in 1880
Railway stations in Great Britain closed in 1885